Bradysia is a genus of fungus gnat in the family Sciaridae. They are commonly known as darkwinged fungus gnats. They are considered a major pest in greenhouse agriculture because they thrive in the moist conditions common inside greenhouses and feed on the plants being grown within. Bradysia is a large genus containing over 500 living species, with at least 65 species found in North America and 172 in Europe.

Bradysia species are a major pollinator of plants such as Aspidistra elatior.

Species 
Selected species of Bradysia include:

B. affinis (Zetterstedt, 1838)
B. alpicola (Winnertz, 1867)
B. amoena (Winnertz, 1867)
B. angustipennis (Winnertz, 1867)
B. angustoocularis Mohrig & Krivosheina, 1989
B. aprica (Winnertz, 7) C
B. arcula Vilkamaa, Salmela & Hippa, 2007
B. atracornea Mohrig & Menzel, 1992
B. austera Menzel et al., 2006
B. bellingeri Shaw, 1953
B. biformis (Lundbeck, 1898)
B. bispina (Fisher, 1938)
B. brevispina Tuomikoski, 1960
B. browni (Shaw, 1935)
B. caldaria (Linyner, 1895)
B. cellarum Frey, 1948
B. chlorocornea Mohrig & Menzel, 1992
B. cinerascens (Grzegorzek, 1884)
B. confinis (Winnertz, 1867)
B. coprophila (Lintner, 1895)
B. cucumeris (Johannsen, 1912)
B. cuneiforma Komarova, 1997
B. dichaeta (Shaw, 1941)
B. diluta (Johannsen, 1912)
B. distincta (Staeger, 1840)
B. dux (Johannsen, 1912)
B. ericia (Pettey, 1918)
B. excelsa Menzel & Mohrig, 1998
B. expolit (Coquillett, 1900)
B. falcata (Pettey, 1918)
B. fatigans (Johannsen, 1912)
B. felti (Pettey, 1918)
B. fenestralis (Zetterstedt, 1838)
B. flavipila Tuomikoski, 1960
B. fochi (Pettey, 1918)
B. forcipulata (Lundbeck, 1898)
B. fugaca Mohrig & Mamaev, 1989
B. fulvicauda (Felt, 1898)
B. fumida (Johannsen, 1912)
B. fungicola (Winnertz, 1867)
B. giraudii (Egger, 1862)
B. groenlandica (Holmgren, 1872)
B. hamata (Pettey, 1918)
B. hartii (Johannsen, 1912)
B. hastata (Johannsen, 1912)
B. heydemanni (Lengersdorf, 1955)
B. hilariformis Tuomikoski, 1960
B. hygida Sauaia & Alves, 1968
B. fungicola (Winnertz, 1867)
B. impatiens (Johannsen, 1912)
B. inusitata Tuomikoski, 1960
B. iridipennis (Zetterstedt, 1838)
B. ismayi Menzel et al., 2006[10]
B. johannseni Enderlein, 1912
B. jucunda (Johannsen, 1912)
B. kaiseri (Shaw, 1941)
B. lapponica (Lengersdorf, 1926)
B. lembkei Mohrig & Menzel, 1990
B. lobosa (Pettey, 1918)
B. longicubitalis (Lengersdorf, 1924)
B. longimentula Sasakawa, 1994
B. longispina (Pettey, 1918)
B. loriculata Mohrig, 1985
B. macclurei (Shaw, 1941)
B. macfarlanei (Jones, 1920)
B. macroptera (Pettey, 1918)
B. mellea (Johannsen, 1912)
B. mesochra (Shaw, 1941)
B. moesta Frey, 1948
B. munda (Johannsen, 1912)
B. mutua (Johannsen, 1912)
B. neglecta (Johannsen, 1912)
B. nemoralis (Meigen, 1818)
B. nervosa (Meigen, 1818)
B. nitidicollis (Meigen, 1818)
B. nigripes (Meigen, 1830)
B. nigrispina Menzel et al., 2006
B. nomica Mohrig & Rsschmann, 1996
B. normalis Frey, 1948
B. ocellaris (Comstock, 1882)
B. odoriphaga Yang & Zhang, 1985
B. ovata (Pettey, 1918)
B. pallipes (Fabricius, 1787)
B. paradichaeta (Shaw, 1941)
B. parilis (Johannsen, 1912)
B. pauperata (Winnertz, 1867)
B. pectoralis (Staeger, 1840)
B. penna (Pettey, 1918)
B. peraffinis Tuomikoski, 1960
B. petaini (Pettey, 1918)
B. picea (Rubsaamen, 1894)
B. pilata (Pettey, 1918)
B. placida (Winnertz, 1867)
B. pollicis (Pettey, 1918)
B. polonica (Lengersdorf, 1929)
B. praecox (Meigen, 1818)
B. procera (Winnertz, 1868)
B. prolifica (Felt, 1898)
B. protohilaris Mohrig & Krivosheina, 1983
B. quadrispinistylata Alam, 1988
B. quadrispinosa (Pettey, 1918)
B. quadrispinosa (Pettey, 1918)
B. reflexa Tuomikoski, 1960
B. sachalinensis Mohrig & Krivosheina, 1989
B. scabricornis Tuomikoski, 1960
B. sexdentata (Pettey, 1918)
B. silvestrii (Kieffer, 1910)
B. similigibbosa Köhler & Menzel, 2013
B. smithae Menzel & Heller, 2005
B. spinata (Pettey, 1918)
B. splendida Mohrig & Krivosheina, 1989
B. strenua (Winnertz, 1867)
B. strigata (Staeger, 1840)
B. subaprica Mohrig & Krivosheina, 1989
B. subgrandis (Shaw, 1941)
B. subrufescens Mohrig & Krivosheina, 1989
B. subvernalis Mohrig & Heller, 1992
B. tilicola (Loew, 1850)
B. trifurca (Pettey, 1918)
B. trispinifera Mohrig & Krivosheina, 1979
B. tritici (Coquillett, 1895)
B. trivialis (Johannsen, 1912)
B. trivittata (Staeger, 1840)
B. trivittata (Staeger, 1840)
B. unguicauda (Malloch, 1923)
B. urticae Mohrig & Menzel, 1992
B. vagans (Winnertz, 1868)
B. varians (Johannsen, 1912)
B. vernalis (Winnertz, 1868)
B. zetterstedti Mohrig & Menzel, 1993

Data sources: C = Catalogue of Life, I = ITIS, N = NCBI

References 

Sciaridae
Insects described in 1867